The Ukrainian Canadian internment was part of the confinement of "enemy aliens" in Canada during and for two years after the end of the First World War. It lasted from 1914 to 1920, under the terms of the War Measures Act.

Canada was at war with Austria-Hungary. Along with Austrian-Hungarian prisoners of war, about 8,000 Ukrainian men, women, and children – those of Ukrainian citizenship as well as naturalized Canadians of Ukrainian descent – were kept in twenty-four internment camps and related work sites (also known, at the time, as concentration camps). Their savings were confiscated  and many had land taken while imprisoned as the land was "abandoned". 
Some were "paroled" from camps in 1916–17, many were put to work as unpaid workers on farms, mines, and railways, where labour was scarce. 
Much existing Canadian infrastructure from 1916-1917 was built by this unpaid labour. 

Another 80,000 were not imprisoned but were registered as "enemy aliens" and obliged to regularly report to the police and were required to carry identifying documents at all times or suffer punitive consequences.

The embarrassment and trauma of internment caused many Ukrainians to change their family names, hide their imprisonment and abandon traditions due to fear of negative repercussions – causing PTSD and intergenerational trauma. In addition, some maintain that the Canadian government approved key records to be destroyed in the 1950s, leaving documentation to be based on individual family records and pleas to the local communities where the camps were located.

Internment
During the First World War, a growing sentiment against "enemy aliens" had manifested itself amongst Canadians. The British government urged Canada not to act indiscriminately against subject nationalities of the Austro-Hungarian Empire who were in fact friendly to the British Empire. However, Ottawa took a hard line. These enemy-born citizens were treated as social pariahs, and many lost their employment. Under the 1914 War Measures Act, "aliens of enemy nationality" were compelled to register with authorities. About 70,000 Ukrainians from Austria-Hungary fell under this description. 8,579 males and some women and children were interned by the Canadian Government, including 5,954 Austro-Hungarians, most of whom were probably ethnic Ukrainians. Most of the 8,600 people interned were young men apprehended while trying to cross the border into the U.S. to look for jobs; attempting to leave Canada was illegal. Most of the interned were poor or unemployed single men, although 81 women and 156 children (mainly Germans in Vernon and Ukrainians at Spirit Lake) had no choice but to accompany their menfolk to two of the camps, in Spirit Lake, near Amos, Quebec, and Vernon, British Columbia. Some of the internees were Canadian-born and others were naturalized British subjects, although most were recent immigrants. Citizens of the Russian Empire were generally not interned.

Many of these internees were used for forced labour in internment camps.

There was a severe shortage of farm labour, so in 1916–17 nearly all of the internees were "paroled". Many parolees went to the custody of local farmers. They were paid at current wage rates, usually 20 cents per hour, with fifty cents a day deducted for room and board. Other parolees were sent as paid workers to railway gangs and mines. The internees turned over all their cash to authorities – $329,000 in total, of which $298,000 was returned to them on release.

Camps
Conditions at the camps varied, and the Castle Mountain Internment Camp – where labour contributed to the creation of Banff National Park – was considered exceptionally harsh and abusive. The internment continued for two more years after the war had ended, although most Ukrainians were paroled into jobs for private companies by 1917. Even as parolees, they were still required to report regularly to the police authorities. Federal and provincial governments and private concerns benefited from the internees' labour and from the confiscation of what little wealth they had, a portion of which was left in the Bank of Canada at the end of the internment operations on June 20, 1920. A small number of internees, including men considered to be "dangerous foreigners", labour radicals, or particularly troublesome internees, were deported to Europe after the war, largely from the Kapuskasing camp, which was the last to be shut down.

Of those interned, 109 died of various diseases and injuries sustained in the camp, six were killed while trying to escape, and some – according to Major-General Sir William Otter's final report – went insane or committed suicide as a result of their confinement.

A list of the camps follows:

Legacy

Since 1985, the organized Ukrainian-Canadian community has sought official acknowledgment for this World War I internment, conducting a campaign that underscored the moral, legal and political obligation to redress the historical wrong. The campaign, spearheaded by the Ukrainian Canadian Civil Liberties Association (UCCLA), included the memorialization of places of internment as historic sites. Currently there are twenty plaques and memorials across Canada commemorating the internment, including two at the locations of former concentration camps in Banff National Park. These have been placed by the UCCLA and its supporters.

In 1994 Yurij Luhovy and the National Film Board of Canada released a feature-length documentary about the internment operations entitled Freedom Had a Price. While researching for and shooting the film, Yurij discovered never before seen pictures of the camps and donated them to the National Archives of Canada.

On November 25, 2005, the Senate of Canada voted unanimously to pass Bill C-331, the 'Internment of Persons of Ukrainian Origin Recognition Act', closely following the vote of the House of Commons on November 23, 2005, and it received Royal Assent. This act acknowledges that persons of Ukrainian origin were interned in Canada during the First World War and legally obliges the Government of Canada to negotiate "an agreement concerning measures that may be taken to recognize the internment" for educational and commemorative projects.

Thought to be the last known survivor of the internment measures, Mary Manko Haskett was only a child of 6 when she was interned with her family at Spirit Lake. She died in July 2007. In 2007 another survivor – Mary Hancharuk, born in the Spirit Lake camp – was found; then aged 92, making her the last known survivor of the internment operations. She died in 2008.

Canadian First World War Internment Recognition Fund
The Ukrainian Canadian campaign for acknowledgement and redress was spearheaded by members of the Ukrainian Canadian Civil Liberties Association from the mid-1980s (at that time within the Ukrainian Canadian Congress). On May 9, 2008, the Canadian government established a $10 million fund. The Endowment Council of the Canadian First World War Internment Recognition Fund uses the interest earned on that amount to fund projects that commemorate the experience of thousands of Ukrainians and other Europeans interned between 1914–20 and the many others who suffered a suspension of their civil liberties and freedoms. The funds are themselves held in trust by the Ukrainian Canadian Foundation of Taras Shevchenko.

On September 12, 2009, the Canadian First World War Internment Recognition Fund (CFWWIRF) was announced formally with a notice published in The Globe and Mail describing how individuals or groups can apply for funding for commemorative, educational and cultural activities recalling Canada's first national internment operations.

One of the first projects funded by CFWWIRF was the documentary Jajo's Secret directed by filmmaker James Motluk and broadcast on OMNI TV in 2009. This movie tells the story of Motluk's discovery of a parole certificate issued to his late grandfather, Elias, in 1918. More recently the CFWWIRF supported two additional films, The Camps and That Never Happened, by Ryan Boyko, as well as the preparation of lesson plans and other educational materials suitable for teachers across Canada (available for free on the website of the CFWWIRF).

The "Kingston Symposium" of the CFWWIRF's Endowment Council was held in Kingston, Ontario on June 17–20, 2010, bringing together community activists, descendants, academics and artists to discuss ways and means for commemorating Canada's first national internment operations.

Construction of the 'Spirit Lake Camp Interpretive Centre' was launched in July 2010 and on November 26, 2011, opened officially in a ceremony attended by the Honourable Jason Kenney, then Minister of Citizenship and Immigration, who referred to the internment operations as "a blight" on Canadian history. The CFWWIRF's Endowment Council made the funding of this interpretive centre one of its top granting priorities, budgeting $400,000 over five years for this project. A permanent exhibit on Canada's first national internment operations was opened at the Cave and Basin National Historic Site in Banff National Park in September 2013 by Kenney, then Minister of Employment and Social Development and Minister for Multiculturalism.

On August 22, 2014, one hundred bilingual English-French plaques were unveiled to recall the 100th anniversary of the implementation of the 1914 War Measures Act and the start of internment operations across Canada.

In 2017 the CFWWIRF supported the installation of a permanent exhibit about Canada's first national internment operations in the Canada History Hall of the Canadian Museum of History in Gatineau, Quebec. Funding has also been committed by the CFWWIRF for the unveiling of a major new exhibit in 2021 at the museum dealing with the War Measures Act and civil liberties during the First and Second World Wars and the October Crisis.

The 100th anniversary of the end of Canada's first national internment operations was commemorated on Saturday, June 20, 2020 – a notice was published by the Ukrainian Canadian Civil Liberties Foundation (www.ucclf.ca) in the national edition of The Globe and Mail, with the support of the Endowment Council of the Canadian First World War Internment Recognition Fund.

See also
 Human rights in Canada
 Ukrainian Canadians
 Ukrainian Austrian internment (First World War)
 Italian Canadian internment
 Internment of Japanese Canadians (Second World War)

References

Further reading
 Kordan, Bohdan and Peter Melnycky (1991), In the Shadow of the Rockies: Diary of the Castle Mountain Internment Camp, Edmonton: CIUS Press.
 Farney, James, and Bohdan S. Kordan, "The Predicament of Belonging: The Status of Enemy Aliens in Canada, 1914," Journal of Canadian Studies 39.1 (2005) 74–89 online
 Kordan, Bohdan (2002), Enemy Aliens: Prisoners of War: Internment in Canada During the Great War, Montreal-Kingston: McGill-Queen's University Press.
 Kordan, Bohdan and Craig Mahovsky (2004), A Bare and Impolitic Right: Internment and Ukrainian Canadian Redress, Kingston: McGill-Queen's University Press.
 Luciuk, Lubomyr Y., and Stella Hryniuk, eds. (1991) Canada's Ukrainians: Negotiating an Identity pp 288–303
 Luciuk, Lubomyr (2000) Searching for Place: Ukrainian Displaced Persons, Canada and the Migration of Memory (University of Toronto Press, reprinted in 2001).
 Luciuk, Lubomyr (2001), In Fear of the Barbed Wire Fence: Canada's First National Internment Operations and the Ukrainian Canadians, 1914–1920,  Kingston: Kashtan Press.
 Luciuk, Lubomyr (2006), Without Just Cause, Kingston: Kashtan Press.
 Luhovy, Yurij (1994), Freedom Had a Price: Canada's First National Internment Operations 1914–1920, VHS/DVD, 55 min.
 Martynowych, Orest (1991), "Registration, Internment and Censorship", in Ukrainians in Canada: The formative period, 1891–1924, pp 323–34.  Edmonton: Canadian Institute of Ukrainian Studies. .
 Swyripa, Frances and John Herd Thompson, eds. (1983) Loyalties in Conflict: Ukrainians in Canada During the Great War; 213pp; 8 essays by scholars

Comparative studies
 "Italian Canadians interned in Canada. Italian Canadians as Enemy Aliens: Memories of WWII

External links

 Bill C-331, An Act to acknowledge that persons of Ukrainian origin were interned in Canada during the First World War and to provide for recognition of this event.
 "Freedom Had A Price" on Yurij Luhovy's website
 PM Reaches out to Ukrainians – The Globe and Mail, August 25, 2005
 Ukrainian Canadian Civil Liberties Association
 Canadian First World War Internment Recognition Fund
 Escape Attempt at Castle Mountain
 Ukrainian Canadian Civil Liberties Foundation

Military history of Canada
Canada in World War I
Internments in Canada
History of human rights in Canada
Society of Ukraine
World War I crimes by the British Empire and Commonwealth
Anti-Ukrainian sentiment